The Dort Motor Car Company of Flint, Michigan, built automobiles from 1915 to 1924.

In 1886, William Crapo "Billy" Durant and Josiah Dallas ("Dallas") Dort, as equal partners, established the Flint Road-Cart Company, later named the Durant-Dort Carriage Company. By 1900 it was the largest manufacturer of horse-drawn vehicles in the United States. In 1914, Durant sold out of the business and departed, amicably, to pursue his existing interests in General Motors. Dallas Dort and the remaining stockholders took over the carriage business, incorporated the Dort Motor Car Company, and used some of the same plant to manufacture Dort cars.

Dort's chief engineer, the Swiss mechanic Louis Chevrolet, together with noted French designer Étienne Planche, designed the company's product. Two models were launched in 1915 and 1916: both touring cars (i.e., open cars without a fixed roof) with a 4-cylinder, 17-horsepower (12.7-kilowatt) Lycombe engine. They quickly acquired a reputation for being reliable. Demand became so strong – 9,000 cars in its first year – that the company opened an extra factory  to the south of Flint, adjacent to Detroit at Windsor, in the Canadian province of Ontario.

In 1917, three more models were introduced: the Cloverleaf roadster and two sedan (closed-in) models. 

Dort's cars came at a premium: whereas Ford Model T cars were selling for $440 in 1915, the Dort sedan sold in 1917 at $1,065; the convertible sedan at $815; the five-place open tourer at $695, and the roadster at $695.

A coupé followed in 1918. In the company's peak year, 1920, production was 30,000 cars. Subsequently, more luxurious models, including the Harvard and Yale, were introduced with design features derived from a Rolls-Royce model, and a six-cylinder car was produced in 1923.

Dort had become the country's 13th largest automobile producer by 1920. The company built new large factory on the east end of Flint; however, the post-World War I recession took hold at the same time. The company started bleeding cash and attempted to seek capital or a merger partner, neither of which eventuated; staff numbers were cut and expenses were curtailed. By 1924, J. Dallas Dort was ready to retire, and liquidated the company. The new factory building was sold to AC Spark Plug to manufacture carburetor air filters and fuel pumps. Dort died while playing golf on May 17, 1925, aged 64.

Notes

References

See also
 Gray-Dort Motors Ltd.

Vintage vehicles
Defunct motor vehicle manufacturers of the United States
Motor vehicle manufacturers based in Michigan
Vehicle manufacturing companies established in 1915
Vehicle manufacturing companies disestablished in 1924
1915 establishments in Michigan
1924 disestablishments in Michigan
Defunct manufacturing companies based in Michigan